Grand Portage National Monument is a United States National Monument located on the north shore of Lake Superior in northeastern Minnesota that preserves a vital center of fur trade activity and Anishinaabeg Ojibwe heritage. The area became one of the British Empire's four main fur trading centers in North America, along with Fort Niagara, Fort Detroit, and Michilimackinac.

This path is part of the historic trade route of the French-Canadian voyageurs and coureur des bois between their wintering grounds and their depots to the east.

Composed of the Pigeon River and other strategic interior streams, lakes, and portages, this route was of enormous importance in pre-industrial times. It provided quick water access from Canada's settled areas and Atlantic ports to the fur-rich Rupert's Land and the North-Western Territory. Grand Portage therefore was an essential link between the drainage basin of the Nelson River to Hudson Bay and that of the Saint Lawrence River to the Atlantic Ocean.

History

As early as 2,000 years ago, Indian Nations probably used Gichi-onigaming, or "the Great Carrying Place", to travel from summer homes on Lake Superior to winter hunting grounds in the interior of Minnesota and Ontario. In 1729 Cree guide Auchagah drew a map for Pierre Gaultier de Varennes, sieur de La Vérendrye, one of the early French fur traders, showing how to reach the "western sea" of Lake Winnipeg. In time, Grand Portage became the gateway into rich northern fur-bearing country, where it connected remote interior outposts to lucrative international markets.

The Grand Portage trail is an  trail connecting Grand Portage with Fort Charlotte on the Pigeon River.  Voyageurs from the Rupert's Land would carry their furs by canoe to Fort Charlotte, and portage the bundles of fur to Grand Portage.  There they met traders from Montreal, and exchanged the furs for trade goods and supplies.  Each canoe "brigade" then returned to its starting place.  The fur traders built Fort Charlotte as a trading fort at Grand Portage.  There they built the Grand Hall in the French colonial style, which housed their meetings, a general store, and other facilities.

British operations in Grand Portage came under pressure after the signing of the Jay Treaty in 1795, the finalization of western portion of the U.S./Canada border in 1818, and gradual settlement of the Minnesota Territory by U.S. settlers. In mid-July 1802, partners of the North West Company, the most successful fur trade company in North America, met in their Grand Hall at Grand Portage. Almost from the time the British Nor'Westers had organized at Grand Portage in the mid-1780s, an emerging United States wanted them to stop competing with Americans in this territory.

The July vote meant that the North West Company would tear down its 18 buildings and transport the materials north in company schooners for use in constructing the planned new Fort William, far from U.S. soil. The buildings were constructed from native squared spruce, pine and birch and were surrounded by more than 2,000 cedar pickets.

In 1854 the Ojibwe signed a treaty with the U.S. establishing Grand Portage as part of their reservation. A school was established to educate the tribe members and a post office was created in 1856. In 1887 the government chose to abolish the reservation, opening it to general settlement.

In 1951 the property was designated as the Grand Portage National Historic Site and opened for visitors.  In 1958, it was designated a National Monument.  The portage trail has also been separately designated a Minnesota State Historic Site. The monument's  lie entirely within the boundaries of Grand Portage Indian Reservation.  The depot was reconstructed to allow celebration of the fur trade and Ojibwe lifeways.  It was added to the National Register of Historic Places in 1966.

Attractions and events
The portage trail exists in much the same location and condition as in historic times.  Visitors can hike  from Lake Superior to the Pigeon River.

Volunteers and park staff at the monument dress in period attire.  They staff the Kitchen, Great Hall, Canoe Warehouse, Ojibwe Village and Voyageur Encampment in and around the Stockade, and explain and interpret what life was like at the trading post at the turn of the 18th century.  During the second weekend of August, the Grand Portage National Monument hosts a rendezvous re-enactment.  At the same time, the Grand Portage Indian Reservation holds a pow wow, which attracts many Indians and visitors.  The Rendezvous and Pow Wow coincide with the Perseid meteor shower.

The four corner rooms off of the Great Hall are each decorated to represent a different aspect of the fur trade, including a shareholder's bedroom, a trading post with examples of furs and goods that would have been exchanged, a London streetscape with finished goods made from the furs that came through Grand Portage, and a hatter's shop showing the steps of turning beaver pelts into fine felt hats.

Grand Portage National Monument Heritage Center

Opened in 2007, the Grand Portage National Monument Heritage Center features exhibit galleries about Ojibwe culture and the fur trade, a bookstore, multi-media programs, park offices, archives and a classroom.  The center is a collaboration between the National Park Service and the Grand Portage Band of Lake Superior Chippewa.  It overlooks the reconstructed fur trading post.

Grand Portage

Voyageur route

This section covers the voyageur route from Grand Portage westward to the juncture of the route from Fort William at Lac La Croix. The Pigeon River is about  directly north of the reconstructed fort. The portage existed to bypass the river east of Fort Charlotte. From Fort Charlotte the canoe route then went west up the Pigeon past the mouth of the Arrow River to the east-west Mountain Lake. The voyageurs, with their heavy freight canoes, cut a new route that ran west over the Petit Neuf or Watape Portage to Watape Lake which is in the Arrow River drainage. Then through the Petit Detroit to Rove Lake and the Grand Neuf or Long Portage to Rose Lake at the west end of Arrow Lake. From Rose Lake up the Arrow to South Lake. From South Lake north over the 700-yard Height of Land Portage to North Lake whose waters flow west to Lake Winnipeg. From here the route went west down the ? river through several lakes to Lac La Croix where the route from Fort William came in.

Trail today
The Grand Portage was developed in order to avoid numerous short portages.  Beginning at the stockade on Grand Portage Bay of Lake Superior, the  trail leads westward into the wilderness to a mid-point on the Pigeon River, bypassing numerous rapids and a variety of waterfalls. (The most notable are Middle Falls and Pigeon Falls. Both are part of the Grand Portage State Park and are within the Rove Formation.  Middle Falls is most easily seen from Pigeon River Provincial Park on the Canadian side of the border.)

The portage begins on Lake Superior, elevation , rising as it moves westward through two notches in the Sawtooth Mountain range. It briefly levels off around  after . Another  you reach the inland county highway. The trail's high point is the head of a drainage flowing to the Pigeon River at Fort Charlotte. The headwaters has become a large beaver pond. The dam is located along the trail route and has a boardwalk atop it, added for modern visitors.

Archeology

Almost all the information known about the physical layout of Grand Portage National Monument comes from archeological studies.
 Cooper, David J., Of Sextants and Satellites: David Thompson and the Grand Portage GIS Study CRLS Colloquium, Kenora, Ontario, Canada, 2004.
 Hamilton, Scott, Graham, James, Norris, Dave, "If These Walls Could Speak:" Using GIS to Explore the Fort at Grand Portage National Monument, Department of Anthropology, Lakehead University, Thunder Bay Ontario, Canada, 2004.
 Birk, Douglas A., Archeologist/Historian, Grand Portage National Monument Maintenance Area Preliminary Survey, February 2006.
 Clark, Caven, Ph.D., Late Prehistoric Cultural Affiliation Study, Grand Portage National Monument, Prepared by Archeological Consulting Services, Ltd., Tempe, Arizona, November 9, 1999
 Woolworth, Alan R., An Historical Study of the Grand Portage, Grand Portage National Monument, Minnesota, Minnesota Historical Society, St. Paul, Minnesota, 1993
 Woolworth, Alan. Archaeological Excavations at the North West Company's Depot, Grand Portage, Minnesota in 1970–1971 (1975)
 Woolworth, Alan. Archaeological Excavations at Grand Portage National Monument: 1963–1964 Field Season (1969)
 Woolworth, Alan. Archaeological Excavations at Grand Portage National Monument: 1962 Field Season (1968)
 Woolworth, Alan. Archaeological Excavations at the North West Company's Fur Trade Post, Grand Portage, Minnesota, in 1936–1937 (1963)

Route west
John McDonell, a clerk for the North West Company, identified the routes between Grand Portage and Rainy Lake in the 1790s.  Henry Hind in 1860 traced the route and provided more details than provided by McDonell.

Image gallery

See also
 List of national monuments of the United States
 Coureur des bois
 Fur trade
 Fort William Historical Park
 Grand Portage, Minnesota – Unorganized Territory of Cook County
 Grand Portage Indian Reservation
 Grand Portage State Park, Minnesota
 Grand Portage (community), Minnesota – Unincorporated community located within both the reservation and unorganized territory
 Indiana Dunes National Lakeshore and the Joseph Bailly Homestead
 Isle Royale National Park
 Joseph Bailly
 North West Company
 Pigeon River
 Territorial era of Minnesota
 Voyageurs
 Witch Tree

References

External links

 National Park Service - Grand Portage National Monument
 Information on the Grand Portage band of Chippewa
 Video documentary on 'Grand Portage during the peak of the Fur Trade'
 Manitoba Historical Society:  Grand Portage - Bas de la Riviere Route (F)

1960 establishments in Minnesota
Fur trade
Historic trails and roads in Minnesota
Living museums in Minnesota
Museums in Cook County, Minnesota
National Park Service National Monuments in Minnesota
Native American history of Minnesota
Native American museums in Minnesota
North West Company
Ojibwe in Minnesota
Protected areas established in 1960
Protected areas of Cook County, Minnesota
Historic districts on the National Register of Historic Places in Minnesota
National Register of Historic Places in Cook County, Minnesota
Portages on the National Register of Historic Places
Ojibwe culture